Bob Cortese (born March 8, 1943) is a former American football player and coach.  He served as the head football coach at Mesa State College—now known as Colorado Mesa University from 1980 to 1989 at Fort Hays State University from 1990 to 1997, compiling a career college football coaching record of 133–60–6.  Cortese was also a head coach in the Arena Football League, with the Oklahoma Wranglers from 2000 to 2001 and the Grand Rapids Rampage in 2004.

Head coaching record

College

Arena Football League

References

External links
 AreanFan.com profile

1943 births
Living people
American football guards
Colorado Buffaloes football coaches
Colorado Buffaloes football players
Fort Hays State Tigers football coaches
Colorado Mesa Mavericks football coaches
Oklahoma Wranglers coaches
Grand Rapids Rampage coaches
High school football coaches in Colorado
Sportspeople from Rochester, New York